The Kansas Sentencing Commission is an administrative agency that is part of the executive branch of Kansas state government.  The purpose of the Kansas Sentencing Commission is to maintain an effective, fair, and efficient sentencing system for the state of Kansas.

Mission and Philosophy 
The agency's stated guiding philosophy is that the imposition of incarceration should be used in only the most serious offenders.  The 17 member commission is also charged to develop a sentencing guidelines model or grid based on fairness and equity and...provide a mechanism for linking justice and corrections policies.

History
The Kansas Sentencing Commission was established in 1989 as a result of the passage of Senate Bill 50 that same year. The enabling legislation, "The Kansas Sentencing Guidelines Act" is set forth in K.S.A. 21-4701 et seq. The Commission's offices are located in Topeka, Kansas.

References

External links
Annual Reports of the Kansas Sentencing Commission
Kansas Government Information Online Library (Scroll down to Sentencing Commission)

Sentencing commissions in the United States
State agencies of Kansas
Government of Kansas
1989 establishments in Kansas